Vandament Glacier is an east-flowing glacier, 6 nautical miles (11 km) long, draining the east-central portion of the Dominion Range icecap. The glacier lies close south of Koski Glacier, whose flow it parallels, and terminates 2 nautical miles (3.7 km) northwest of Safety Spur. It was named by the Advisory Committee on Antarctic Names (US-ACAN) for Charles H. Vandament, the United States Antarctic Research Program (USARP) ionospheric physicist at South Pole Station, 1962.

Charles H. Vandament (08/02/1935- 10/10/2005), known to family and friends as "Smilin' Chuck", was an engineer and scientist specializing in radio and antenna design. An Electrical Engineering graduate of the University of Arkansas, Mr. Vandament went to work for Collins Radio in Cedar Rapids, Iowa in 1958, and subsequently retired from Rockwell-Collins in Richardson, Texas in 1992. He then continued working for Rockwell-Collins as a consultant for another 11 years. A specialist in High Frequency (HF) radio transmitter and antenna design, Chuck took an 18 month leave from Collins in 1961 and 1962 to do ionospheric HF radio research at the Amundsen-Scott South Pole station, working for the then National Bureau of Standards, (now NIST - National Institute of Standards and Technology).  Although his career with Collins included many significant technical successes and achievements in his field, professionally, he was most proud of the ground-breaking research he conducted during his 13 months wintering-over at "the Pole".  Chuck never tired of sharing his unique experiences from his year at the South Pole, and over the next 35 years, he gave hundreds of slide show presentations about Antarctica to fourth grade elementary school classes studying the continent, as well as to dozens of civic and church groups. 

A military veteran, Chuck served as a cryptographer and code-breaker with U.S. Army Intelligence.
 

Glaciers of the Ross Dependency
Dufek Coast